Sefton Glacier is a glacier about 10 nautical miles (18 km) long, flowing into the south side of Byrd Glacier just west of Rundle Peaks. Named by the Advisory Committee on Antarctic Names (US-ACAN) for Ronald Sefton, ionospheric physicist, a member of the Byrd Station winter parties of 1962 and 1964.

Glaciers of Oates Land